Penguin Celebrations was a book series released by Penguin Books in 2008, Penguin re-released 36 modern popular works using Penguin's distinctive late 1940s style, rebranded 'Penguin Celebrations'. Following the 1940s style; Green is for 'mystery', Orange for 'fantastic fiction', Pink for 'distant lands', Dark Blue for 'real lives' and Purple for 'viewpoints'.

The 'Penguin Celebrations' books are as follows:
Fiction
William Boyd - Any Human Heart
Jonathan Coe - What a Carve Up!
Jonathan Safran Foer - Everything Is Illuminated
Zoë Heller - Notes on a Scandal
Nick Hornby - How to Be Good
Marian Keyes - The Other Side of the Story
Matthew Kneale - English Passengers
Hari Kunzru - The Impressionist
Marina Lewycka - A Short History of Tractors in Ukrainian
Meg Rosoff - How I Live Now
Ali Smith - The Accidental
Zadie Smith - White Teeth
Sue Townsend - Adrian Mole and the Weapons of Mass Destruction
Pat Barker - Regeneration

Non-fiction
Noam Chomsky - Hegemony or Survival
Niall Ferguson - Empire
Robin Lane Fox - The Classical World
Malcolm Gladwell - Blink
Brian Greene - The Fabric of the Cosmos
Steven Levitt and Stephen J. Dubner - Freakonomics
James Lovelock - The Revenge of Gaia
Eric Schlosser - Fast Food Nation

Crime
Donna Tartt - The Secret History
P. D. James - A Certain Justice
John Mortimer - Rumpole and the Penge Bungalow Murders
Alex Garland - The Beach
Barbara Vine - The Chimney-sweeper's Boy

Travel and adventure
Ryszard Kapuściński - The Shadow of the Sun
Redmond O'Hanlon - Congo Journey
Paul Theroux - Dark Star Safari

Biography
Charles Nicholl - Leonardo da Vinci: Flights of the Mind
Claire Tomalin - Jane Austen: A Life
Jeremy Paxman - The English

Essays
Alain de Botton - The Consolations of Philosophy
Jeremy Clarkson - The World According to Clarkson
Alistair Cooke - Letter from America

References

Penguin Books book series
Pearson plc